Michael Denley (born 21 November 1931) is a British athlete. He competed in the men's javelin throw at the 1952 Summer Olympics.

References

1931 births
Living people
Athletes (track and field) at the 1952 Summer Olympics
British male javelin throwers
Olympic athletes of Great Britain
People from Wandsworth
Athletes from London
Members of Thames Valley Harriers